Christopher Hudgens (born December 13, 1977) is a noted American-born artist working in Chicago, Illinois.

History
Hudgens was born in Houston, Texas. He was raised in Bacliff, Texas, for ten years and later moved to three cities in North Carolina, St. Louis, Missouri, Chicago, Carbondale, Illinois, and Detroit, Michigan. His work has been largely shown in Chicago, St. Louis, and Detroit. His work in Chicago with Bad at Sports as the Operations Manager, Bridge Art Fair as Business Operations Manager and other work in the Chicago art scene with groups like Literago, Make Magazine, The Parlor and Madhatters Ball gave the base for his reputation in the Chicago arts as a competent project manager and technology adviser for the independent art world.  Hudgens received his BFA from Southern Illinois University.

Exhibitions and events
Hudgens has been active nationally since 1996 and internationally as an artist since 2007, and has won various awards, publications and exhibitions. As an art organizer, he is a frequent contributor to Chicago's  Bad at Sports as well as Operations Manager. His work with the Bridge Art Fair up until the company closed in 2009 included shows in London, Miami Beach, New York City, and Berlin, helping to create shows that had yearly attendances over 100,000 and revenue over $4,000,000 USD.

References

http://www.artfacts.net/index.php/pageType/newsInfo/newsID/4049
http://proximitymagazine.com/2009/09/top-ten-links-with-christopher-hudgens
http://video.nytimes.com/video/2008/03/29/arts/1194817121708/urbaneye-art-fairs-in-new-york.html
http://www.artnet.com/magazineus/reviews/davis/davis12-14-06_detail.asp?picnum=7

External links
Christopher Hudgens (official site)
Bad at Sports, Internationally recognized Art Audio Interview Program & Magazine Site
Review by ArtReview Magazine of NYC gallery show saying:
The liveliest work on view, however, is in apexart's window, where a monitor shows animated credits listing Bad at Sports's contributors. Created by B@S member Christopher Hudgens in the style of designer and filmmaker Saul Bass, well known for his masterful film titles, the retro graphics, limited animation and jazz soundtrack mesh seamlessly, while managing to get in a dig at Flood for good measure.
L Magazine Review of NYC gallery show saying:
Some names we recognize and like: Guerra De La Paz, Jeremy Deller, Tony Fitzpatrick, Liam Gillick, Christopher Hudgens and William Powhida.
Interview with Christopher Hudgens by Proximity Magazine
5.13.99 "Research on the Internet" Wall Street Journal; Marketplace Print interview with Hudgens in the Wall Street Journal

1977 births
Living people
20th-century American painters
American male painters
21st-century American painters
21st-century American male artists
People from Galveston County, Texas
Southern Illinois University alumni
Artists from Chicago
20th-century American male artists